Homesick Future is an EP by Canadian indie pop band Young Liars. Originally, released independently by the band in 2011, it was that material which eventually got them signed to Nettwerk where it was given a proper release by the label on February 24, 2012. The EP's single "Colours" was released December 20. 2011.

Track listing

Personnel
Jordan Raine – vocals, guitar, drums
Ty Badali – drums
Angelo Ismir– guitar, backing vocals
Andrew Beck – bass
Wesley Nickel – keyboards, backing vocals

Production
Digory Smallz- production, mixing & audio engineering
Christian Wright- mastering

References

2012 EPs
Young Liars (band) albums